Sammy Davis Jr. Sings the Big Ones for Young Lovers is an album by Sammy Davis Jr. that was released in 1964 and arranged by Jimmie Haskell and Perry Botkin Jr.

Track listing
"Kansas City" (Leiber and Stoller) – 2:48
"Don't Shut Me Out" (Stephanie Louis) – 2:30
"Deep Purple" (Peter DeRose, Mitchell Parish) – 3:08
"Walk Right In" (Gus Cannon, Hosea Woods) – 2:45
"I Left My Heart in San Francisco" (George Cory, Douglass Cross) – 2:25
"Choose" (Lionel Bart) – 2:49
"Days of Wine and Roses" (Henry Mancini, Johnny Mercer) – 2:37
"Blue Velvet" (Lee Morris, Bernie Wayne) – 2:46
"Not for Me" (Bobby Darin) – 2:53
"I Wanna Be Around" (Mercer, Sadie Vimmerstadt) – 2:36
"It's All in the Game" (Charles G. Dawes, Carl Sigman) – 3:00
"Fools Rush In" (Rube Bloom, Mercer) – 2:42

Personnel 
Sammy Davis Jr. – vocals
Jimmie Haskell – arrangement, conductor
Perry Botkin Jr.

References

1964 albums
Sammy Davis Jr. albums
Reprise Records albums
Albums conducted by Perry Botkin Jr.
Albums conducted by Jimmie Haskell
Albums arranged by Perry Botkin Jr.
Albums arranged by Jimmie Haskell